Gunnbjörn's skerries (Gunnbjarnarsker) were a group of small islands lying close between Iceland and Greenland, discovered by Gunnbjörn Ulfsson in the 9th century. They became a popular stopover for ships traveling to Greenland and a brief attempt to set up a colony was made about 970. Snæbjörn Galti visited around 978. A later attempt succeeded and by 1391 there were 18 farms on the islands. Apparently in 1456, according to Ruysch's 1507 map, the islands "completely burned up", i.e. were destroyed by a volcanic eruption. Ivar Bardsen mentions them in his work "Description of Greenland in the Fourteenth Century".  On later maps, as late as 1700, such as Jan van Keulen's "Pascaert van Groenlandt", the shoals formed by the remains of the explosion was noted with the name "Gombar Scheer".

The location of the former islands is not exactly known.

References

Former islands
Islands of the North Atlantic Ocean
Skerries